Jersey Milk is a chocolate bar brand consisting of solid milk chocolate. It has a white wrapper with gold writing. The Jersey Milk chocolate bar was introduced in 1924. Originally produced by Neilson Dairy, production was transferred to Cadbury's when Neilson sold the Cadbury's product lines that Neilson had acquired in 1987 back to Cadbury's in 1996, but Jersey Milk packages continue to bear the Neilson brand as of January 2022.

As of April 2016, the only package of Jersey Milk listed on the Snack Works web site is a 700 gram package of Jersey Milk Miniatures, although the Canadian Favourites web site lists a 180 gram pack of four 45 gram bars, London Drugs offers 45 gram bars, and Amazon.com offers a 100 gram bar.

Flavours of Jersey Milk 
Jersey Milk Milk Chocolate
Jersey Milk Miniatures 
Jersey Milk Buds
Jersey Milk with Peanuts 
Jersey Milk Treasures (A candy bar where each square contains one of six different flavours. Turkish Delight, Caramel, Praline, Bordeaux, Strawberry and Nougat.

See also
Cadbury Dairy Milk

References

Chocolate bars
Canadian confectionery
Products introduced in 1924
1924 establishments in Canada